Kirovsky District is one of the twenty-two administrative and municipal districts (raion) in Primorsky Krai, Russia. It is located in the west of the krai. Its administrative center is the urban locality (an urban-type settlement) of Kirovsky. Population:  The population of the administrative center accounts for 42.6% of the district's total population.

Geography
Forests occupy half of the district's territory.

Economy and tourism
Agriculture, beekeeping, and timber-cutting are considered to have potential.

Health resorts development dominates the economy of the district. Narzan-type Shmakovskiye mineral springs (hydrocarbonated and calcium-magnesium), with limpid water rich in carbonic acid, are well-known. Shmakovka is a unique health-center complex where is situated Imeni Pyatidesyatiletiya Oktyabrya Health Resort for three hundred people.

The district's landmarks include a tower-chapel located on one of the highest viewpoints of the Shmakovka Resort.

References

Notes

Sources

Districts of Primorsky Krai